"The Peeler and the Goat" is an old Irish ditty that continues to be sung in taverns and pubs throughout the world.

History 
Originally written by Darby Ryan of Bansha, Tipperary, over a century and a half ago, The Peeler and the Goat was inspired by a number of factors affecting 19th century Ireland. The Penal Laws had been passed with the intent of persecuting the Irish Catholic population and Sir Robert Peel had been appointed Secretary of Ireland by the British Government in 1812. Creating a police force as one of his first acts (an action thought of by the population of Ireland to simply be further interference with their liberties by Britain), his new officers were soon nicknamed Bobbies, a nickname that continues to this day, and Peelers, after their creator.

Inspiration 
The song is reportedly inspired by police officers (Peelers) taking a number of goats into 'custody' for creating an obstruction on a road in Ireland.

Plot  

A police officer finds a goat roaming the streets of Bansha and, presuming her to be either a loiterer or a prostitute ('Stholler', as used in the poem, has both of these definitions), announces that he will soon send her off to prison. The police officer and the goat argue over the circumstances of her arrest, and whether or not the police officer would actually be able to get a conviction for a crime not committed. At the end of the song, the goat accuses the police officer of being drunk, and asserts that if she had had enough money to purchase illegal liquor for the police officer, would have been allowed to go free.

Symbolism 
 The Goat: Generally thought of as representing the persecuted Catholics of Ireland. This conclusion is supported by statements such as "No penal law did I transgress", and the general behavior of the Peeler towards the goat. The fact that the goat is female does not appear to be of any particular significance.
 The Peeler: A member of the overseas police force of Britain, the Peeler is used to represent the absurd laws enacted upon the Irish by the British. His absurd statements and bizarre logic, as well as the (apparently not unreasonable) suggestion that he is drunk, suggest the true target and intent of the satirical message.

References 
 Full Text

Irish folk songs
Year of song unknown